George E. Diskant (February 22, 1907 – February 22, 1965) was a film and television cinematographer.  After working as an assistant on a number of films in the early thirties, Diskant graduated to first camera.  Early jobs include a pair of Leon Errol shorts; Banjo, a dog story; and Anthony Mann's Desperate.  Other films include a series of films noir including They Live by Night (1949), Port of New York (1949), The Racket (1951), On Dangerous Ground (1952), The Narrow Margin (1952), Beware, My Lovely (1952), and Kansas City Confidential (1952).  Later in his career, Diskant worked exclusively in television on shows such as "Playhouse 90", Sam Peckinpah's short-lived "The Westerner", and many episodes of "The Rifleman".

External links
Find-A-Grave profile for George E. Diskant
George E. Diskant at IMDb

American cinematographers
1907 births
1965 deaths